Drasteria grandirena, the figure-seven moth or great kidney, is a moth of the family Erebidae first described by Adrian Hardy Haworth in 1809. It is found in North America from Ontario, Quebec and Nova Scotia, south to at least Georgia west to at least Arkansas

The wingspan is about 35 mm. Adults are on wing from March to August in California.

The larvae feed on Hamamelis virginiana.

References

External links

 Images]
Line, Larry. "Drasteria grandirena". Moths of Maryland. Retrieved December 9, 2019.

Drasteria
Moths of North America
Moths described in 1809